A haengjeongdong, haengchŏngtong, haengchongtong, or administrative neighborhood is an administrative unit in South Korea in cities. Township have smaller populations than towns and represent the rural areas of a county or city.

List of administrative neighborhoods in South Korea

Provincial level cities

Gyeonggi

Gangwon

North Chungcheong

South Chungcheong

North Jeolla

South Jeolla

North Gyeongsang

South Gyeongsang

Jeju

See also 
 Administrative divisions of South Korea

References 

 
Neighborhoods